Lepophidium is a genus of cusk-eels.

Species
There are currently 21 recognized species in this genus:
 Lepophidium aporrhox C. R. Robins, 1961 (Dusky cusk-eel)
 Lepophidium brevibarbe (G. Cuvier, 1829) (Shortbeard cusk-eel)
 Lepophidium collettei C. R. Robins, R. H. Robins & M. E. Brown, 2012
 Lepophidium crossotum C. R. Robins, R. H. Robins & M. E. Brown, 2012
 Lepophidium cultratum C. R. Robins, R. H. Robins & M. E. Brown, 2012
 Lepophidium entomelan C. R. Robins, R. H. Robins & M. E. Brown, 2012
 Lepophidium gilmorei C. R. Robins, R. H. Robins & M. E. Brown, 2012
 Lepophidium jeannae Fowler, 1941 (Mottled cusk-eel)
 Lepophidium kallion C. R. Robins, 1959
 Lepophidium marmoratum (Goode & T. H. Bean, 1885)
 Lepophidium microlepis (C. H. Gilbert, 1890) (Silver cusk-eel)
 Lepophidium negropinna Hildebrand & F. O. Barton, 1949 (Specklefin cusk-eel)
 Lepophidium pardale (C. H. Gilbert, 1890) (Leopard cusk-eel)
 Lepophidium pheromystax C. R. Robins, 1960 (Blackedge cusk-eel)
 Lepophidium profundorum (T. N. Gill, 1863) (Blackrim cusk-eel)
 Lepophidium prorates (D. S. Jordan & Bollman, 1890) (Prowspine cusk-eel)
 Lepophidium robustum C. R. Robins, R. H. Robins & M. E. Brown, 2012
 Lepophidium staurophor C. R. Robins, 1959 (Barred cusk-eel)
 Lepophidium stigmatistium (C. H. Gilbert, 1890) (Blotchfin cusk-eel)
 Lepophidium wileyi C. R. Robins, R. H. Robins & M. E. Brown, 2012
 Lepophidium zophochir C. R. Robins, R. H. Robins & M. E. Brown, 2012

References

Ophidiidae
Ray-finned fish genera
Taxa named by Theodore Gill